Kirsten Price (born November 13, 1981) is an American pornographic actress, model, and feature dancer.

Early life 
Price, whose real name is Katherine and goes by Kate, was born in Providence, Rhode Island and is of French and Italian descent. She was raised in Boston, Massachusetts. She studied criminal justice while attending Fisher College in Massachusetts, and she has also lived in New York City, where she worked as a go-go dancer and cocktail waitress.

Career 

Price chose the first name Kirsten for her stage name because it was the true name of her best friend, who was also an adult entertainer. She has stated that, as a child, she wanted to be a model on The Price Is Right, which is how she came up with the last name Price. She began her adult career doing nude modeling and stripping. Her first two scenes were in Dressed for Sex for Original Sin Films and Wet Teens 7 for Simon Wolf Productions. She eventually signed a contract with Wicked Pictures in 2005. She also competed in Miss Hawaiian Tropic pageants before entering the adult film industry in 2004.

In 2006, Price appeared as one of four finalists (and the eventual winner) on the first season of the reality TV program My Bare Lady. In March 2006, Jesse Jane and Price became the hosts of Playboy TV's most popular live show, Night Calls, and Price has previously hosted the Playboy TV series The Bang. Price also played a small role in an episode of the television series Weeds.

She had her breasts augmented in late 2009.

Price co-hosted the 2010 AVN Awards show, along with porn actress Kayden Kross and comedian Dave Attell. In 2010 and 2011, Price appeared several times, including as an extreme sports correspondent, on the G4TV late-night program "Rated A For Adult". She has worked for both Playboy and Showtime as a red-carpet reporter, and she has co-hosted (with Dave Navarro) the AVN Awards red carpet event for several years.

Personal life 
Price married fellow porn actor Barrett Blade on October 9, 2004, but they have since divorced. She took a break from adult films for a while after she got divorced from Blade. She is now married to pornographic actor Keiran Lee, and the couple have three children.

Awards 
 2007 AVN Award – Best Supporting Actress (Film) – Manhunters
 2007 AVN Award – Best Group Sex Scene (Film) – FUCK (with Carmen Hart, Katsumi, Mia Smiles, Eric Masterson, Chris Cannon, Tommy Gunn, & Randy Spears)
 2010 AVN Award – Best Group Sex Scene – 2040 (with Jessica Drake, Alektra Blue, Mikayla Mendez, Kaylani Lei, Tory Lane, Jayden Jaymes, Kayla Carrera, Randy Spears, Brad Armstrong, Rocco Reed, Marcus London, Mick Blue, & T.J. Cummings)
 2018 AVN Hall of Fame

References

Notes

External links 

 
 
 
 
 "4 Porn Stars Talk About How They Fell in Love"
 

1981 births
Living people
21st-century American actresses
Actresses from Boston
Actresses from New York City
American people of French descent
American people of Italian descent
American pornographic film actresses
Actors from Providence, Rhode Island
Fisher College alumni
Pornographic film actors from Massachusetts
Pornographic film actors from New York (state)
Pornographic film actors from Rhode Island